Mary Therese McCarthy (June 21, 1912 – October 25, 1989) was an American novelist, critic and political activist, best known for her novel The Group, her marriage to critic Edmund Wilson, and her storied feud with playwright Lillian Hellman. McCarthy was the winner of the Horizon Prize in 1949 and was awarded two Guggenheim Fellowships, in 1949 and 1959. She was a member of the National Institute of Arts and Letters and the American Academy in Rome. In 1973, she delivered the Huizinga Lecture in Leiden, the Netherlands, under the title Can There Be a Gothic Literature? The same year she was elected a Fellow of the American Academy of Arts and Sciences. She won the National Medal for Literature and the Edward MacDowell Medal in 1984. McCarthy held honorary degrees from Bard, Bowdoin, Colby, Smith College, Syracuse University, the University of Maine at Orono, the University of Aberdeen, and the University of Hull.

Literary career and public life 
Her debut novel, The Company She Keeps, received critical acclaim as a succès de scandale, depicting the social milieu of New York intellectuals of the late 1930s with unreserved frankness. It includes her celebrated short story "The Man in the Brooks Brothers Shirt" which Partisan Review published in 1941. It recounts the sexual encounter of a young bohemian intellectual woman and a middle-aged businessman encountered in the club car of a train. Although she finds him fat and grey, she is intrigued by his elegant Brooks Brothers shirts and his knowledge of literary figures. The story depicts—shockingly for the literary fiction of the era—not only the act of a woman choosing to engage in sexual activites with a stranger but, more importantly, what that act shows of her needs and desires and the complexity of who she is.

After building a reputation as a satirist and critic, McCarthy enjoyed popular success when the 1963 edition of her novel The Group remained on the New York Times Best Seller list for almost two years. Her work is noted for its precise prose and its complex mixture of autobiography and fiction.

Randall Jarrell's 1954 novel Pictures from an Institution is said to be about McCarthy's year teaching at Sarah Lawrence.

Her feud with fellow writer Lillian Hellman formed the basis for the play Imaginary Friends by Nora Ephron. The feud had simmered since the late 1930s over ideological differences, particularly the questions of the Moscow Trials and of Hellman's support for the "Popular Front" with Joseph Stalin. McCarthy provoked Hellman in 1979 when she said on The Dick Cavett Show: "every word [Hellman] writes is a lie, including 'and' and 'the'." Hellman responded by filing a $2.5 million libel suit against McCarthy, which ended shortly after Hellman died in 1984. Observers of the trial noted the irony of Hellman's defamation suit was that it brought significant scrutiny. It resulted in a decline of Hellman's reputation, as McCarthy and her supporters worked to prove that Hellman had lied.

Although McCarthy broke ranks with some of her Partisan Review colleagues when they swerved toward conservative politics after World War II, she carried on lifelong friendships with Dwight Macdonald, Nicola Chiaromonte, Philip Rahv, F. W. Dupee and Elizabeth Hardwick. Perhaps most prized of all was her close friendship with Hannah Arendt, with whom she maintained a sizable correspondence widely regarded for its intellectual rigor. After Arendt's passing, McCarthy became Arendt's literary executor, serving from 1976 until her own death in 1989. As executor, McCarthy prepared Arendt's unfinished manuscript The Life of the Mind for publication. McCarthy taught at Bard College from 1946 to 1947, and again between 1986 and 1989. She also taught a winter semester in 1948 at Sarah Lawrence College.

Ideology 

McCarthy left the Catholic Church as a young woman, becoming an atheist. McCarthy treasured her religious education for the classical foundation it provided her intellect while at the same time she depicted her loss of faith and her contests with religious authority as essential to her character.

In New York, she moved in "fellow-traveling" Communist circles early in the 1930s, but by the latter half of the decade she repudiated Soviet-style Communism, expressing solidarity with Leon Trotsky after the Moscow Trials, and vigorously countering playwrights and authors she considered to be sympathetic to Stalinism.

As part of the Partisan Review circle and as a contributor to The Nation, The New Republic, Harper's Magazine, and The New York Review of Books, she garnered attention as a cutting critic, advocating the necessity for creative autonomy that transcends doctrine. During the 1940s and 1950s she became a liberal critic of both McCarthyism and Communism. She maintained her commitment to liberal critiques of culture and power to the end of her life, opposing the Vietnam War in the 1960s and covering the Watergate scandal hearings in the 1970s.

Opposition to Vietnam War
In 1967 and 1968, McCarthy travelled to North and South Vietnam, to report on the war from an anti-war perspective. She documented her observations in two books: Vietnam, and Hanoi.

Interviewed after her first trip, she declared on British television that there was not a single documented case of the Viet Cong deliberately killing a South Vietnamese woman or child. She wrote favorably about the Viet Cong.

McCarthy visited North Vietnam in March 1968, only a month after the Tet Offensive created havoc in South Vietnam.  In her book, Hanoi, McCarthy provides a rare English-language description of life in North Vietnam during the war. McCarthy describes an orderly society, in which everyone pitched in to help with the war effort. North Vietnam received advance warning of most bombing attacks and McCarthy regularly had to take cover from American bombs.

McCarthy's visits to Vietnam were controversial. During her visit to North Vietnam, she met briefly with U.S. Air Force officer James Risner, who was being held as a prisoner of war by North Vietnam. Years later, after his release, Risner attacked McCarthy for her not having recognized that he had been tortured by the North Vietnamese while in custody.

Personal life
Born in Seattle, Washington to Roy Winfield McCarthy and his wife Martha Therese (née Preston), McCarthy and her three brothers were orphaned when both their parents died in the flu epidemic of 1918. She and her brothers, Kevin, Preston and Sheridan, were raised in very unhappy circumstances by her Catholic father's parents in Minneapolis, Minnesota, under the direct care of an uncle and aunt whom she remembered for harsh treatment and abuse.

When the situation became intolerable, McCarthy was taken in by her maternal grandparents in Seattle. Her maternal grandmother, Augusta Morganstern, was Jewish, and her maternal grandfather, Harold Preston, a prominent attorney and co-founder of the law firm Preston Gates & Ellis, was Presbyterian. Her brothers were sent to boarding school.

McCarthy credited her grandfather, who helped draft one of the nation's first Workmen's Compensation Acts, with helping form her liberal views. McCarthy explores the complex events of her early life in Minneapolis and her coming-of-age in Seattle in her memoir, Memories of a Catholic Girlhood. Her younger brother, Kevin McCarthy, became an actor and starred in such movies as Death of a Salesman (1951) and Invasion of the Body Snatchers (1956).

Under the guardianship of the Prestons, McCarthy studied at the Convent of the Sacred Heart - Forest Ridge in Seattle and Annie Wright Seminary in Tacoma. She attended Vassar College, in Poughkeepsie, New York, where she graduated in 1933 with an A.B. cum laude and was elected to Phi Beta Kappa.

Marriage and family
McCarthy married four times. In 1933 she married Harald Johnsrud, an actor and playwright. She and critic Philip Rahv were lovers. Her best-known spouse was her second husband, writer and critic Edmund Wilson, whom she married in 1938 after leaving Rahv. Wilson and McCarthy had a son, Reuel Wilson.

After they divorced, in 1946 she married Bowden Broadwater, who worked for the New Yorker. They also divorced. In 1961, McCarthy married career diplomat James R. West.

Death
McCarthy died of lung cancer on October 25, 1989, at NewYork–Presbyterian Hospital in New York City.

Film portrayals
In the 2012 German movie Hannah Arendt, Mary McCarthy is portrayed by Janet McTeer.

Selected works
 "The Man in The Brooks Brothers Shirt", published in Partisan Review in 1941: 
 The Company She Keeps (1942), Harvest/HBJ, 2003 reprint: 
 The Oasis (1949), Backinprint.com, 1999 edition: 
 Cast a Cold Eye (1950), HBJ, 1992 reissue: 
 The Groves of Academe (1952), Harvest/HBJ, 2002 reprint: 
 A Charmed Life (1955), Harvest Books, 1992 reprint: 
 Sights and Spectacles: 1937–1956 (1956), FSG 
 Venice Observed (1956), Harvest/HBJ, 1963 edition:  (the 1963 edition lacks the illustrations present in the original book)
 Memories of a Catholic Girlhood (1957), Harvest/HBJ, 1972 reprint:  (autobiography)
 The Stones of Florence (1959), Harvest/HBJ, 2002 reprint of 1963 edition:  (the 1963 edition lacks the illustrations present in the original book)
 On the Contrary (1961), LBS, 1980 reissue: 
 The Group (1963), 1963 edition from Harvest/HBJ, 1991 reprint: , adapted as a 1966 movie of the same name.
 Vietnam (1967), Harcourt, Brace & World,  
 Hanoi (1968), Harcourt, Brace & World, 
 The Writing on the Wall (1970), Mariner Books, 
 Birds of America (1971), Harcourt, 1992 reprint: 
 Medina (1972), Harvest/HBJ, 
 The Mask of State: Watergate Portraits (1974), Harvest Books, 
 Cannibals and Missionaries (1979), Harvest/HBJ, 1991 reprint: 
 Ideas and the Novel (1980), Harvest/HBJ, 
 The Hounds of Summer and Other Stories (1981), Avon Books, 
 Occasional Prose (1985), HBJ
 How I Grew (1987), Harvest Books,  (intellectual autobiography age 13–21)
 Intellectual Memoirs (1992), published posthumously (edited and with a foreword by Elizabeth Hardwick)
 A Bolt from the Blue and Other Essays (2002), New York Review Books, (compilation of essays and critiques),

Books about McCarthy
Sam Reese, The Short Story in Midcentury America: Countercultural Form in the Work of Bowles, McCarthy, Welty, and Williams, (2017), Louisiana State University Press, 
Sabrina Fuchs Abrams, Mary McCarthy: Gender, Politics, And The Postwar Intellectual, (2004), Peter Lang Publishing, 
Eve Stwertka (editor), Twenty-Four Ways of Looking at Mary McCarthy: The Writer and Her Work, (1996), Greenwood Press, 
Carol Brightman (editor), Between Friends: The Correspondence of Hannah Arendt and Mary McCarthy 1949–1975, (1996), Harvest/HBJ, 
Carol Brightman, Writing Dangerously: Mary McCarthy And Her World, (1992), Harvest Books, 
Joy Bennet, Mary McCarthy; An Annotated Bibliography, (1992), Garland Press, 
Carol Gelderman, Mary McCarthy: A Life, 1990, St Martins Press, 
Doris Grumbach, The Company She Kept, 1967, Coward-McCann, Inc., LoC CCN: 66-26531,
Alan Ackerman, Just Words, (2011), Yale University Press, 
Michelle Dean, Sharp: The Women Who Made an Art of Having an Opinion, (2018), Grove Press, 
Frances Kiernan, Seeing Mary Plain: A Life of Mary McCarthy, (2000), W. W. Norton & Company, ISBN 0-393-03801-7

References

Further reading

External links

 New York Times Featured Author Page (Book Reviews, Interviews, Sound Clips.)
 Literary Encyclopedia (in-progress)
 
 Brief bio at Vassar College
 Map of Mary's NYC, 1936–1938 based on Intellectual Memoirs
 

1912 births
1989 deaths
20th-century American novelists
American atheists
American women novelists
American people of Jewish descent
American people of Irish descent
Vassar College alumni
Fellows of the American Academy of Arts and Sciences
Deaths from lung cancer in New York (state)
Members of the American Academy of Arts and Letters
Analysands of Sándor Radó
Writers from New York City
Writers from Seattle
Bard College faculty
Women in warfare post-1945
American women in the Vietnam War
Women war correspondents
American women dramatists and playwrights
20th-century American women writers
20th-century American dramatists and playwrights
The Nation (U.S. magazine) people
The New Republic people
People from Castine, Maine
Novelists from Washington (state)
Novelists from New York (state)
American women academics